Alberta Provincial Highway No. 550, commonly referred to as Highway 550, is an east–west highway in southern Alberta, Canada. Township Road 212 functions as a western extension of Highway 550 and connects to Bassano.

History 
Highway 550, along Highway 873 between Brooks and Duchess, was originally designated as part of Highway 2, which at the time was an east–west interprovincial highway that ran through Calgary and Medicine Hat (the present-day Highway 2 was designated as Highway 1).  In 1941, Highway 2 was renumbered to Highway 1 to allow for contiguous numbering through Western Canada along the future Trans-Canada Highway, which was commissioned in 1949.  In the mid-1950s, the Trans-Canada Highway was realigned between Brooks and Bassano, resulting in the Duchess-Bassano section being decommissioned and reverting to the County of Newell.  When the Secondary Highway system was established in the mid 1970s, the route became Highway 550.

Major intersections 
From west to east:

References 

550
Former segments of the Trans-Canada Highway